Schindler's List may refer to:
 a list of Jews called the Schindlerjuden who were saved during the Holocaust by Oskar Schindler
 US edition title of Schindler's Ark, fiction novel by Australian novelist Thomas Keneally (1982)
 Schindler's List, American historical drama film directed by Steven Spielberg (1993)
 Schindler's List (soundtrack), film score of the film of the same name, composed and conducted by John Williams (1993)